Mosquitoes (or mosquitos) are approximately 3,600 species of small flies comprising the family Culicidae (from the Latin culex meaning "gnat"). The word "mosquito" (formed by mosca and diminutive -ito) is Spanish for "little fly". Mosquitoes have a slender segmented body, one pair of wings, one pair of halteres, three pairs of long hair-like legs, and elongated mouthparts.

The mosquito life cycle consists of egg, larva, pupa, and adult stages. Eggs are laid on the water surface; they hatch into motile larvae that feed on aquatic algae and organic material. These larvae are important food sources for many freshwater animals, such as dragonfly nymphs, many fish, and some birds such as ducks. The adult females of most species have tube-like mouthparts (called a proboscis) that can pierce the skin of a host and feed on blood, which contains protein and iron needed to produce eggs. Thousands of mosquito species feed on the blood of various hosts ⁠— vertebrates, including mammals, birds, reptiles, amphibians, and some fish; along with some invertebrates, primarily other arthropods.

The mosquito's saliva is transferred to the host during the bite, and can cause an itchy rash. In addition, many species can ingest pathogens while biting, and transmit them to future hosts. In this way, mosquitoes are important vectors of parasitic diseases such as malaria and filariasis, and arboviral diseases such as yellow fever, Chikungunya, West Nile, dengue fever, and Zika. By transmitting diseases, mosquitoes cause the deaths of more people than any other animal taxon: over 700,000 each year. It has been claimed that almost half of the people who have ever lived have died of mosquito-vectored disease, but this claim is disputed, with more conservative estimates placing the death toll closer to 5% of all humans. Mosquitoes cannot live or function properly when the air temperature is below 10 degrees Celsius (50 degrees Fahrenheit). They are mostly active at 15–25 degrees Celsius (59–77 degrees Fahrenheit).

Fossil record and evolutionary history 

The oldest known mosquitoes are known from amber dating to the Late Cretaceous. Three species of Cretaceous mosquito are currently known, Burmaculex antiquus and Priscoculex burmanicus are known from Burmese amber from Myanmar, which dates to the earliest part of the Cenomanian stage of the Late Cretaceous, around 99 million years ago. Paleoculicis minutus, is known from Canadian amber from Alberta, Canada, which dates to the Campanian stage of the Late Cretaceous, around 79 million years ago. Priscoculex burmanicus can be definitively assigned to Anophelinae, one of the two subfamilies of mosquitoes alongside Culicinae, indicating the split between these two subfamilies occurred over 99 million years ago. Molecular estimates suggest that the split between the two subfamilies occurred 197.5 million years ago, during the Early Jurassic, but that major diversification did not take place until the Cretaceous.

The mosquito Anopheles gambiae is currently undergoing speciation into the M(opti) and S(avanah) molecular forms. Consequently, some pesticides that work on the M form no longer work on the S form.
Over 3,500 species of the Culicidae have already been described. They are generally divided into two subfamilies which in turn comprise some 43 genera. These figures are subject to continual change, as more species are discovered, and as DNA studies compel rearrangement of the taxonomy of the family. The two main subfamilies are the Anophelinae and Culicinae, with their genera as shown in the subsection below. The distinction is of great practical importance because the two subfamilies tend to differ in their significance as vectors of different classes of diseases. Roughly speaking, arboviral diseases such as yellow fever and dengue fever tend to be transmitted by Culicine species, not necessarily in the genus Culex. Some transmit various species of avian malaria, but it is not clear that they ever transmit any form of human malaria. Some species transmit various forms of filariasis, much as many Simuliidae do.

Taxonomy

Family
Mosquitoes are members of a family of nematoceran flies: the Culicidae (from the Latin , genitive , meaning "midge" or "gnat"). Superficially, mosquitoes resemble crane flies (family Tipulidae) and chironomid flies (family Chironomidae).

Subfamilies
 Anophelinae
 Culicinae

Genera

Mosquitoes have been classified into 112 genera, some of the more common of which appear below.

 Aedeomyia
 Aedes
 Anopheles
 Armigeres
 Ayurakitia
 Borachinda
 Coquillettidia
 Culex
 Culiseta
 Deinocerites
 Eretmapodites
 Ficalbia
 Galindomyia
 Haemagogus
 Heizmannia
 Hodgesia
 Isostomyia
 Johnbelkinia
 Kimia
 Limatus
 Lutzia
 Malaya
 Mansonia
 Maorigoeldia
 Mimomyia
 Onirion
 Opifex
 Orthopodomyia
 Psorophora
 Runchomyia
 Sabethes
 Shannoniana
 Topomyia
 Toxorhynchites
 Trichoprosopon
 Tripteroides
 Udaya
 Uranotaenia
 Verrallina
 Wyeomyia

Species
Over 3,500 species of mosquitoes have thus far been described in the scientific literature.

Genomics
An analysis by Matthews et al. 2018 suggests mosquito species all carry a large and diverse number of transposable elements.

Morphology 
As true flies, mosquitoes have one pair of wings, with distinct scales on the surface. Their wings are long and narrow, as are their long, thin legs. They have slender and dainty bodies of length typically 3–6mm, with dark grey to black coloring. Some species harbor specific morphological patterns. When at rest they tend to hold their first pair of legs outward. They are similar in appearance to midges (Chironomidae), another ancient family of flies. Tokunagayusurika akamusi, for example, is a midge fly that looks very much like mosquitoes in that they also have slender and dainty bodies of similar colors, though larger in size. They also have only one pair of wings, but without scales on the surface. Another distinct feature to tell the two families of flies apart is the way they hold their first pair of legs – mosquitoes hold them outward, while midges hold them forward.

Life cycle

Overview
Like all flies, mosquitoes go through four stages in their life cycles: egg, larva, pupa, and adult or imago. The first three stages—egg, larva, and pupa—are largely aquatic. Each of the stages typically lasts 5 to 14 days, depending on the species and the ambient temperature, but there are important exceptions. Mosquitoes living in regions where some seasons are freezing or waterless spend part of the year in diapause; they delay their development, typically for months, and carry on with life only when there is enough water or warmth for their needs. For instance, Wyeomyia larvae typically get frozen into solid lumps of ice during winter and only complete their development in spring. The eggs of some species of Aedes remain unharmed in diapause if they dry out, and hatch later when they are covered by water.

Eggs hatch to become larvae, which grow until they are able to change into pupae. The adult mosquito emerges from the mature pupa as it floats at the water surface. Bloodsucking mosquitoes, depending on species, sex, and weather conditions, have potential adult lifespans ranging from as short as a week to as long as several months. Some species can overwinter as adults in diapause.

Breeding
In most species, adult females lay their eggs in stagnant water: some lay near the water's edge while others attach their eggs to aquatic plants. Each species selects the situation of the water into which it lays its eggs and does so according to its own ecological adaptations. Some breed in lakes, some in temporary puddles. Some breed in marshes, some in salt-marshes. Among those that breed in salt water (such as Opifex fuscus), some are equally at home in fresh and salt water up to about one-third the concentration of seawater, whereas others must acclimatize themselves to the salinity. Such differences are important because certain ecological preferences keep mosquitoes away from most humans, whereas other preferences bring them right into houses at night.

Some species of mosquitoes prefer to breed in phytotelmata (natural reservoirs on plants), such as rainwater accumulated in holes in tree trunks, or in the leaf-axils of bromeliads. Some specialize in the liquid in pitchers of particular species of pitcher plants, their larvae feeding on decaying insects that had drowned there or on the associated bacteria; the genus Wyeomyia provides such examples — the harmless Wyeomyia smithii breeds only in the pitchers of Sarracenia purpurea.

Some of the species of mosquitoes that are adapted to breeding in phytotelmata are dangerous disease vectors. In nature, they might occupy anything from a hollow tree trunk to a cupped leaf. Such species typically take readily to breeding in artificial water containers. Such casual puddles are important breeding places for some of the most serious disease vectors, such as species of Aedes that transmit dengue and yellow fever. Some with such breeding habits are disproportionately important vectors because they are well-placed to pick up pathogens from humans and pass them on. In contrast, no matter how voracious, mosquitoes that breed and feed mainly in remote wetlands and salt marshes may well remain uninfected, and if they do happen to become infected with a relevant pathogen, might seldom encounter humans to infect, in turn.

Eggs and oviposition

Mosquito habits of oviposition, the ways in which they lay their eggs, vary considerably between species, and the morphologies of the eggs vary accordingly. The simplest procedure is that followed by many species of Anopheles; like many other gracile species of aquatic insects, females just fly over the water, bobbing up and down to the water surface and dropping eggs more or less singly. The bobbing behavior occurs among some other aquatic insects as well, for example mayflies and dragonflies; it is sometimes called "dapping". The eggs of Anopheles species are roughly cigar-shaped and have floats down their sides. Females of many common species can lay 100–200 eggs during the course of the adult phase of their life cycles. Even with high egg and intergenerational mortality, over a period of several weeks, a single successful breeding pair can create a population of thousands.

Some other species, for example members of the genus Mansonia, lay their eggs in arrays, attached usually to the under-surfaces of waterlily pads. Their close relatives, the genus Coquillettidia, lay their eggs similarly, but not attached to plants. Instead, the eggs form layers called "rafts" that float on the water. This is a common mode of oviposition, and most species of Culex are known for the habit, which also occurs in some other genera, such as Culiseta and Uranotaenia. Anopheles eggs may on occasion cluster together on the water, too, but the clusters do not generally look much like compactly glued rafts of eggs.

In species that lay their eggs in rafts, rafts do not form adventitiously; the female Culex settles carefully on still water with its hind legs crossed, and as it lays the eggs one by one, it twitches to arrange them into a head-down array that sticks together to form the raft.

Aedes females generally drop their eggs singly, much as Anopheles do, but not as a rule into water. Instead, they lay their eggs on damp mud or other surfaces near the water's edge. Such an oviposition site commonly is the wall of a cavity such as a hollow stump or a container such as a bucket or a discarded vehicle tire. The eggs generally do not hatch until they are flooded, and they may have to withstand considerable desiccation before that happens. They are not resistant to desiccation straight after oviposition, but must develop to a suitable degree first. After that, they can enter diapause for several months if they dry out. Clutches of eggs of the majority of mosquito species hatch as soon as possible, and all the eggs in the clutch hatch at much the same time. In contrast, a batch of Aedes eggs in diapause tends to hatch irregularly over an extended period of time. This makes it much more difficult to control such species than those mosquitoes whose larvae can be killed all together as they hatch. Some Anopheles species do also behave in such a manner, though not to the same degree of sophistication.

Larva 

The mosquito larva has a well-developed head with mouth brushes used for feeding, a large thorax with no legs, and a segmented abdomen.

Larvae breathe through spiracles located on their eighth abdominal segments, or through a siphon, so must come to the surface frequently. The larvae spend most of their time feeding on algae, bacteria, and other microbes in the surface microlayer.

Mosquito larvae have been investigated as prey of other Dipteran flies. Species such as Bezzia nobilis within the family Ceratopogonidae have been observed in experiments to prey upon mosquito larvae.

They dive below the surface when disturbed. Larvae swim either through propulsion with their mouth brushes, or by jerky movements of their entire bodies, giving them the common name of "wigglers" or "wrigglers".

Larvae develop through four stages, or instars, after which they metamorphose into pupae. At the end of each instar, the larvae molt, shedding their skins to allow for further growth.

Pupa 
As seen in its lateral aspect, the mosquito pupa is comma-shaped. The head and thorax are merged into a cephalothorax, with the abdomen curving around underneath. The pupa can swim actively by flipping its abdomen, and it is commonly called a "tumbler" because of its swimming action. As with the larva, the pupa of most species must come to the surface frequently to breathe, which they do through a pair of respiratory trumpets on their cephalothoraxes. They do not feed during this stage; typically they pass their time hanging from the surface of the water by their respiratory trumpets. If alarmed, say by a passing shadow, they nimbly swim downwards by flipping their abdomens in much the same way as the larvae do. If undisturbed, they soon float up again.

After a few days or longer, depending on the temperature and other circumstances, the dorsal surface of its cephalothorax splits, and the adult mosquito emerges. The pupa is less active than the larva because it does not feed, whereas the larva feeds constantly.

Adult 

The period of development from egg to adult varies among species and is strongly influenced by ambient temperature. Some species of mosquitoes can develop from egg to adult in as few as five days, but a more typical period of development in tropical conditions would be some 40 days or more for most species. The variation of the body size in adult mosquitoes depends on the density of the larval population and food supply within the breeding water.

Adult mosquitoes usually mate within a few days after emerging from the pupal stage. In most species, the males form large swarms, usually around dusk, and the females fly into the swarms to mate.

Males typically live for about 5–7 days, feeding on nectar and other sources of sugar. After obtaining a full blood meal, the female will rest for a few days while the blood is digested and eggs are developed. This process depends on the temperature, but usually takes two to three days in tropical conditions. Once the eggs are fully developed, the female lays them and resumes host-seeking.

The cycle repeats itself until the female dies. While females can live longer than a month in captivity, most do not live longer than one to two weeks in nature. Their lifespans depend on temperature, humidity, and their ability to successfully obtain a blood meal while avoiding host defenses and predators.

The length of the adult is typically between 3 mm and 6 mm. Mosquitoes typically weigh around 5 mg. All mosquitoes have slender bodies with three segments: a head, a thorax and an abdomen.

The head is specialized for receiving sensory information and for feeding. It has eyes and a pair of long, many-segmented antennae. The antennae are important for detecting host odors, as well as odors of breeding sites where females lay eggs. In all mosquito species, the antennae of the males in comparison to the females are noticeably bushier and contain auditory receptors to detect the characteristic whine of the females.

The compound eyes are distinctly separated from one another. Their larvae only possess a pit-eye ocellus. The compound eyes of adults develop in a separate region of the head. New ommatidia are added in semicircular rows at the rear of the eye. During the first phase of growth, this leads to individual ommatidia being square, but later in development they become hexagonal. The hexagonal pattern will only become visible when the carapace of the stage with square eyes is molted.

The head also has an elongated, forward-projecting, stinger-like proboscis used for feeding, and two sensory palps. The maxillary palps of the males are longer than their proboscises, whereas the females’ maxillary palps are much shorter. In typical bloodsucking species, the female has an elongated proboscis.

The thorax is specialized for locomotion. Three pairs of legs and a pair of wings are attached to the thorax. The insect wing is an outgrowth of the exoskeleton. Males beat their wings between 450 and 600 times per second.

The abdomen is specialized for food digestion and egg development; the abdomen of a mosquito can hold three times its own weight in blood. This segment expands considerably when a female takes a blood meal. The blood is digested over time, serving as a source of protein for the production of eggs, which gradually fill the abdomen.

Feeding by adults 

Typically, both male and female mosquitoes feed on nectar, aphid honeydew, and plant juices, but in many species the mouthparts of the females are adapted for piercing the skin of animal hosts and sucking their blood as ectoparasites. In many species, the female needs to obtain nutrients from a blood meal before it can produce eggs, whereas in many other species, obtaining nutrients from a blood meal enables the mosquito to lay more eggs. A mosquito has a variety of ways of finding nectar or its prey, including chemical, visual, and heat sensors. Both plant materials and blood are useful sources of energy in the form of sugars, and blood also supplies more concentrated nutrients, such as lipids, but the most important function of blood meals is to obtain proteins as materials for egg production.

When a female reproduces without such parasitic meals, it is said to practice autogenous reproduction, as in Toxorhynchites; otherwise, the reproduction may be termed anautogenous, as occurs in mosquito species that serve as disease vectors, particularly Anopheles and some of the most important disease vectors in the genus Aedes. In contrast, some mosquitoes, for example, many Culex, are partially anautogenous: they do not need a blood meal for their first cycle of egg production, which they produce autogenously; subsequent clutches of eggs are produced anautogenously, at which point their disease vectoring activity becomes operative.

Among humans, the feeding preferences of mosquitoes typically include: those with type O blood, heavy breathers, an abundance of skin bacteria, high body heat, and pregnant women. Individuals' attractiveness to mosquitoes also has a heritable, genetically-controlled component.

Female mosquitoes hunt their blood host by detecting organic substances such as carbon dioxide (CO2) and 1-octen-3-ol (mushroom alcohol, found in exhaled breath) produced from the host, and through visual recognition. Mosquitoes prefer some people over others. The preferred victim's sweat smells more attractive than others' because of the proportions of the carbon dioxide, octenol, and other compounds that make up body odor. The most powerful semiochemical that triggers the keen sense of smell of Culex quinquefasciatus is nonanal. Another compound identified in human blood that attracts mosquitoes is sulcatone or 6-methyl-5-hepten-2-one, especially for Aedes aegypti mosquitoes with the odor receptor gene Or4. A compound called carboxylic acids in human body odor is also found to attract mosquitoes. A large part of the mosquito's sense of smell, or olfactory system, is devoted to sniffing out blood sources. Of 72 types of odor receptors on its antennae, at least 27 are tuned to detect chemicals found in perspiration. In Aedes, the search for a host takes place in two phases. First, the mosquito exhibits a nonspecific searching behavior until the perception of a host's stimulants, then it follows a targeted approach.

Most mosquito species are crepuscular (dawn or dusk) feeders. During the heat of the day, most mosquitoes rest in a cool place and wait for the evenings, although they may still bite if disturbed. Some species, such as the Asian tiger mosquito, are known to fly and feed during daytime.

Prior to and during blood feeding, blood-sucking mosquitoes inject saliva into the bodies of their source(s) of blood. This saliva serves as an anticoagulant; without it the female mosquito's proboscis might become clogged with blood clots. The saliva also is the main route by which mosquito physiology offers passenger pathogens access to the hosts' bloodstream. The salivary glands are a major target to most pathogens, whence they find their way into the host via the saliva.

A mosquito bite often leaves an itchy weal, a raised bump, on the victim's skin, which is caused by histamines trying to fight off the protein left by the attacking insect.

Mosquitoes of the genus Toxorhynchites never drink blood. This genus includes the largest extant mosquitoes, the larvae of which prey on the larvae of other mosquitoes. These mosquito eaters have been used in the past as mosquito control agents, with varying success.

Host animals

Many, if not all, blood-sucking species of mosquitoes are fairly selective feeders that specialise in particular host species, though they often relax their selectivity when they experience severe competition for food, defensive activity on the part of the hosts, or starvation. Some species feed selectively on monkeys, while others prefer particular kinds of birds, but they become less selective as conditions become more difficult. For example, Culiseta melanura sucks the blood of passerine birds for preference, and such birds are typically the main reservoir of the Eastern equine encephalitis virus in North America. Early in the season while mosquito numbers are low, they concentrate on passerine hosts, but as mosquito numbers rise and the birds are forced to defend themselves more vigorously, the mosquitoes become less selective of hosts. Soon the mosquitoes begin attacking mammals more readily, thereby becoming the major vector of the virus, and causing epidemics of the disease, most conspicuously in humans and horses. Multiple mosquitoes' withdrawal of blood from a host can add up to a large volume. In rare cases, heavy mosquito densities have directly killed livestock as large as cattle and horses.

Even more dramatically, in most of its range in North America, the main vector for the Western equine encephalitis virus is Culex tarsalis, because it is known to feed variously on mammals, birds, reptiles, and amphibians. Even fish may be attacked by some mosquito species if they expose themselves above water level, as mudskippers do.

In 1969 it was reported that some species of anautogenous mosquitoes would feed on the haemolymph of caterpillars although its nutritional value is questionable. Other observations include mosquitoes feeding on cicadas and mantids. In 2014, it was shown that malaria-transmitting mosquitoes actively seek out some species of caterpillars and feed on their haemolymph, and do so to the caterpillar's apparent physical detriment.

Mouthparts 
Mosquito mouthparts are very specialized, particularly those of the females, which in most species are adapted to piercing skin and then sucking blood. Apart from bloodsucking, the females generally also drink assorted fluids rich in dissolved sugar, such as nectar and honeydew, to obtain the energy they need. For this, their blood-sucking mouthparts are perfectly adequate. In contrast, male mosquitoes are not bloodsuckers; they only drink sugary fluids. Accordingly, their mouthparts do not require the same degree of specialization as those of females.

Externally, the most obvious feeding structure of the mosquito is the proboscis. More specifically, the visible part of the proboscis is the labium, which forms the sheath enclosing the rest of the mouthparts. When the mosquito first lands on a potential host, its mouthparts are enclosed entirely in this sheath, and it will touch the tip of the labium to the skin in various places. Sometimes, it will begin to bite almost straight away, while other times, it will prod around, apparently looking for a suitable place. Occasionally, it will wander for a considerable time, and eventually fly away without biting. Presumably, this probing is a search for a place with easily accessible blood vessels, but the exact mechanism is not known. It is known that there are two taste receptors at the tip of the labium which may well play a role.

The female mosquito does not insert its labium into the skin; it bends back into a bow when the mosquito begins to bite. The tip of the labium remains in contact with the skin of the host, acting as a guide for the other mouthparts. In total, there are six mouthparts besides the labium: two mandibles, two maxillae, the hypopharynx, and the labrum.

The mandibles and the maxillae are used for piercing the skin. The mandibles are pointed, while the maxillae end in flat, toothed "blades". To force these into the skin, the mosquito moves its head backwards and forwards. On one movement, the maxillae are moved as far forward as possible. On the opposite movement, the mandibles are pushed deeper into the skin by levering against the maxillae. The maxillae do not slip back because the toothed blades grip the skin.

The hypopharynx and the labrum are both hollow. Saliva with anticoagulant is pumped down the hypopharynx to prevent clotting, and blood is drawn up the labrum.

To understand the mosquito mouthparts, it is helpful to draw a comparison with an insect that chews food, such as a dragonfly. A dragonfly has two mandibles, which are used for chewing, and two maxillae, which are used to hold the food in place as it is chewed. The labium forms the floor of the dragonfly's mouth, the labrum forms the top, while the hypopharynx is inside the mouth and is used in swallowing. Conceptually, then, the mosquito's proboscis is an adaptation of the mouthparts that occur in other insects. The labium still lies beneath the other mouthparts, but also enfolds them, and it has been extended into a proboscis. The maxillae still "grip" the "food" while the mandibles "bite" it. The top of the mouth, the labrum, has developed into a channeled blade the length of the proboscis, with a cross-section like an inverted "U". Finally, the hypopharynx has extended into a tube that can deliver saliva at the end of the proboscis. Its upper surface is somewhat flattened so, when the lower part of the hypopharynx is pressed against it, the labrum forms a closed tube for conveying blood from the host.

Saliva 
For the mosquito to obtain a blood meal, it must circumvent the vertebrate's physiological responses. The mosquito, as with all blood-feeding arthropods, has mechanisms to effectively block the hemostasis system with their saliva, which contains a mixture of secreted proteins. Saglin is a protein produced by the salivary glands of mosquitoes. Mosquito saliva acts to reduce vascular constriction, blood clotting, platelet aggregation, angiogenesis and immunity, and creates inflammation. Universally, hematophagous arthropod saliva contains at least one anti-clotting, one anti-platelet, and one vasodilatory substance. Mosquito saliva also contains enzymes that aid in sugar feeding, and antimicrobial agents to control bacterial growth in the sugar meal. The composition of mosquito saliva is relatively simple, as it usually contains fewer than 20 dominant proteins. , scientists still were unable to ascribe functions to more than half of the molecules found in arthropod saliva. One promising application of components of mosquito saliva is the development of anti-clotting drugs, such as clotting inhibitors and capillary dilators, that could be useful for managing cardiovascular disease.

It is now well recognized that feeding ticks, sandflies, and, more recently, mosquitoes, have an ability to modulate the immune response of the animals (hosts) on which they feed. The presence of this activity in vector saliva is a reflection of the inherent overlapping and interconnected nature of the host hemostatic and inflammatory/immunological responses and the intrinsic need to prevent these host defenses from disrupting successful feeding. The mechanism for mosquito saliva-induced alteration of the host immune response is unclear, but the data have become increasingly convincing that such an effect occurs. Early work described a factor in saliva that directly suppresses TNF-α release, but not antigen-induced histamine secretion, from activated mast cells. Experiments by Cross et al. (1994) demonstrated that the inclusion of Ae. aegypti mosquito saliva into naïve cultures led to a suppression of interleukin (IL)-2 and IFN-γ production, while the cytokines IL-4 and IL-5 are unaffected. Cellular proliferation in response to IL-2 is clearly reduced by prior treatment of cells with mosquito salivary gland extract. Correspondingly, activated splenocytes isolated from mice fed upon by either Ae. aegypti or Cx. pipiens mosquitoes produce markedly higher levels of IL-4 and IL-10 concurrent with suppressed IFN-γ production. Unexpectedly, this shift in cytokine expression is observed in splenocytes up to 10 days after mosquito exposure, suggesting natural feeding of mosquitoes can have a profound, enduring, and systemic effect on the immune response.

T cell populations are decidedly susceptible to the suppressive effect of mosquito saliva, showing increased mortality and decreased division rates. Parallel work by Wasserman et al. (2004) demonstrated that T and B cell proliferation was inhibited in a dose dependent manner with concentrations as low as 1/7 of the saliva in a single mosquito. Depinay et al. (2005) observed a suppression of antibody-specific T cell responses mediated by mosquito saliva and dependent on mast cells and IL-10 expression.

A 2006 study suggests mosquito saliva can also decrease expression of interferon−α/β during early mosquito-borne virus infection. The contribution of type I interferons (IFN) in recovery from infection with viruses has been demonstrated in vivo by the therapeutic and prophylactic effects of administration of IFN inducers or IFN itself, and different research suggests mosquito saliva exacerbates West Nile virus infection, as well as other mosquito-transmitted viruses.

Studies in humanized mice bearing a reconstituted human immune system have suggested potential impact of mosquito saliva in humans. Work published in 2018 from the Baylor College of Medicine using such humanized mice came to several conclusions, among them being that mosquito saliva led to an increase in natural killer T cells in peripheral blood; to an overall decrease in ex vivo cytokine production by peripheral blood mononuclear cells (PBMCs); changes to proportions of subsets of PBMCs; changes in the prevalence of T cell subtypes across organs; and changes to circulating levels of cytokines.

Egg development and blood digestion 

Most species of mosquito require a blood meal to begin the process of egg development. Females with poor larval nutrition may need to ingest sugar or a preliminary blood meal before their ovarian follicles can reach their resting stage. Once the follicles have reached the resting stage, digestion of a sufficiently large blood meal triggers a hormonal cascade that leads to egg development. Upon completion of feeding, the mosquito withdraws her proboscis, and as the gut fills up, the stomach lining secretes a peritrophic membrane that surrounds the blood. This membrane keeps the blood separate from anything else in the stomach. Like many Hemiptera and other insects that survive on dilute liquid diets, many adult mosquitoes must excrete unwanted aqueous fractions even as they feed. (See the photograph of a feeding Anopheles stephensi: Note that the excreted droplet patently is not whole blood, being far more dilute). As long as they are not disturbed, this permits mosquitoes to continue feeding until they have accumulated a full meal of nutrient solids. As a result, a mosquito replete with blood can continue to absorb sugar, even as the blood meal is slowly digested over a period of several days. Once blood is in the stomach, the midgut of the female synthesizes proteolytic enzymes that hydrolyze the blood proteins into free amino acids. These are used as building blocks for the synthesis of vitellogenin, which are the precursors for egg yolk protein.

In the mosquito Anopheles stephensi, trypsin activity is restricted entirely to the posterior midgut lumen. No trypsin activity occurs before the blood meal, but activity increases continuously up to 30 hours after feeding, and subsequently returns to baseline levels by 60 hours. Aminopeptidase is active in the anterior and posterior midgut regions before and after feeding. In the whole midgut, activity rises from a baseline of approximately three enzyme units (EU) per midgut to a maximum of 12 EU at 30 hours after the blood meal, subsequently falling to baseline levels by 60 hours. A similar cycle of activity occurs in the posterior midgut and posterior midgut lumen, whereas aminopeptidase in the posterior midgut epithelium decreases in activity during digestion. Aminopeptidase in the anterior midgut is maintained at a constant, low level, showing no significant variation with time after feeding. Alpha-glucosidase is active in anterior and posterior midguts before and at all times after feeding. In whole midgut homogenates, alpha-glucosidase activity increases slowly up to 18 hours after the blood meal, then rises rapidly to a maximum at 30 hours after the blood meal, whereas the subsequent decline in activity is less predictable. All posterior midgut activity is restricted to the posterior midgut lumen. Depending on the time after feeding, greater than 25% of the total midgut activity of alpha-glucosidase is located in the anterior midgut. After blood meal ingestion, proteases are active only in the posterior midgut. Trypsin is the major primary hydrolytic protease and is secreted into the posterior midgut lumen without activation in the posterior midgut epithelium. Aminopeptidase activity is also luminal in the posterior midgut, but cellular aminopeptidases are required for peptide processing in both anterior and posterior midguts. Alpha-glucosidase activity is elevated in the posterior midgut after feeding in response to the blood meal, whereas activity in the anterior midgut is consistent with a nectar-processing role for this midgut region.

Ecology

Distribution
Mosquitoes are cosmopolitan (world-wide): they are in every land region except Antarctica and a few islands with polar or subpolar climates. Iceland is such an island, being essentially free of mosquitoes.

The absence of mosquitoes in Iceland and similar regions is probably because of quirks of their climate, which differs in some respects from mainland regions. At the start of the uninterrupted continental winter of Greenland and the northern regions of Eurasia and America, the pupa enters diapause under the ice that covers sufficiently deep water. The imago emerges only after the ice breaks in late spring. In Iceland, the weather is less predictable. In mid-winter it frequently warms up suddenly, causing the ice to break, but then to freeze again after a few days. By that time the mosquitoes will have emerged from their pupae, but the new freeze sets in before they can complete their life cycle. Any anautogenous adult mosquito would need a host to supply a blood meal before it could lay viable eggs; it would need time to mate, mature the eggs and oviposit in suitable wetlands. These requirements would not be realistic in Iceland and in fact the absence of mosquitoes from such subpolar islands is in line with the islands' low insect biodiversity; Iceland has fewer than 1,500 described species of insects, many of them probably accidentally introduced by human agency. In Iceland most ectoparasitic insects live in sheltered conditions or actually on mammals; examples include lice, fleas and bedbugs, in whose living conditions freezing is no concern, and most of which were introduced inadvertently by humans.

Some other aquatic Diptera, such as Simuliidae, do survive in Iceland, but their habits and adaptations differ from those of mosquitoes; Simuliidae for example, though they, like mosquitoes, are bloodsuckers, generally inhabit stones under running water that does not readily freeze and which is totally unsuited to mosquitoes; mosquitoes are generally not adapted to running water.

Eggs of species of mosquitoes from the temperate zones are more tolerant of cold than the eggs of species indigenous to warmer regions. Many even tolerate subzero temperatures. In addition, adults of some species can survive the winter by taking shelter in suitable microhabitats such as buildings or hollow trees.

Pollination 
Several flowers are pollinated by mosquitoes, including some members of the Asteraceae, Rosaceae and Orchidaceae.

Activity
In warm and humid tropical regions, some mosquito species are active for the entire year, but in temperate and cold regions they hibernate or enter diapause. Arctic or subarctic mosquitoes, like some other arctic midges in families such as Simuliidae and Ceratopogonidae may be active for only a few weeks annually as melt-water pools form on the permafrost. During that time, though, they emerge in huge numbers in some regions and may take up to 300 ml of blood per day from each animal in a caribou herd.

Means of dispersal 
Worldwide introduction of various mosquito species over large distances into regions where they are not indigenous has occurred through human agencies, primarily on sea routes, in which the eggs, larvae, and pupae inhabiting water-filled used tires and cut flowers are transported. They have also been carried by personal vehicles, delivery trucks, trains, and aircraft. Man-made areas such as storm water retention basins, or storm drains also provide sprawling sanctuaries. Sufficient quarantine measures have proven difficult to implement. In addition, outdoor pool areas make a perfect place for them to grow.

Climate and global distribution

Seasonality
In order for a mosquito to transmit a disease to the host there must be favorable conditions, referred to as transmission seasonality. Seasonal factors that impact the prevalence of mosquitoes and mosquito-borne diseases are primarily humidity, temperature, and precipitation. A positive correlation between malaria outbreaks and these climatic variables has been demonstrated in China; and El Niño has been shown to impact the location and number of outbreaks of mosquito-borne diseases observed in East Africa, Latin America, Southeast Asia and India. Climate change impacts each of these seasonal factors and in turn impacts the dispersal of mosquitoes.

Past and future patterns 
Climatology and the study of mosquito-borne disease have been developed only over the past 100 years. Historical records of weather patterns and distinct symptoms associated with mosquito-borne diseases can be utilized to trace the prevalence of these diseases in relation to the climate over longer time periods. Further, statistical models are being created to predict the impact of climate change on vector-borne diseases using these records, and these models can be utilized in the field of public health in order to create interventions to reduce the impact of these predicted outcomes.

Two types of models are used to predict mosquito-borne disease spread in relation to climate: correlative models and mechanistic models. Correlative models focus primarily on vector distribution, and generally function in 3 steps. First, data is collected regarding geographical location of a target mosquito species. Next, a multivariate regression model establishes the conditions under which the target species can survive. Finally, the model determines the likelihood of the mosquito species to become established in a new location based on similar living conditions. The model can further predict future distributions based on environmental emissions data. Mechanistic models tend to be broader and include the pathogens and hosts in the analysis. These models have been used to recreate past outbreaks as well as predict the potential risk of a vector-borne disease based on an areas forecasted climate.

Mosquito-borne diseases are currently most prevalent in East Africa, Latin America, Southeast Asia, and India. An emergence in Europe was recently observed. A weighted risk analysis demonstrated associations to climate for 49% of infectious diseases in Europe including all transmission routes. One statistical model predicts by 2030, the climate of southern Great Britain will be climatically suitable for malaria transmission Plasmodium vivax for 2 months of the year. By 2080 it is predicted that the same will be true for southern Scotland.

Vectors of disease 

Mosquitoes can act as vectors for many disease-causing viruses and parasites. Infected mosquitoes carry these organisms from person to person without exhibiting symptoms themselves. Mosquito-borne diseases include:
 Viral diseases, such as yellow fever, dengue fever, and chikungunya, transmitted mostly by Aedes aegypti. Dengue fever is the most common cause of fever in travelers returning from the Caribbean, Central America, South America, and South Central Asia. This disease is spread through the bites of infected mosquitoes and cannot be spread person to person. Severe dengue can be fatal, but with good treatment, fewer than 1% of patients die from dengue. Work published in 2012 from Baylor College of Medicine suggested that for some diseases, such as dengue fever, which can be transmitted via mosquitoes and by other means, the severity of the mosquito-transmitted disease could be greater.
 The parasitic diseases collectively called malaria, caused by various species of Plasmodium, carried by female mosquitoes of the genus Anopheles.
 Lymphatic filariasis (the main cause of elephantiasis) which can be spread by a wide variety of mosquito species.
 West Nile virus is a significant concern in the United States but there are no reliable statistics on worldwide cases.
 Dengue viruses are a significant health risk globally. Severe cases of dengue often require hospitalization and can be life-threatening shortly after infection. Symptoms include a high fever, aches and pains, vomiting, and rashes. Warning signs of severe dengue infection include vomiting blood, bleeding from the gums or nose, and stomach tenderness/pain.
 Equine encephalitis viruses, such as Eastern equine encephalitis virus, Western equine encephalitis virus, and Venezuelan equine encephalitis virus, can be spread by mosquito vectors such as Aedes taeniorhynchus.
 Tularemia, a bacterial disease caused by Francisella tularensis, is variously transmitted, including by biting flies. Culex and Culiseta are vectors of tularemia, as well as arbovirus infections such as West Nile virus.
 Zika, recently notorious, though rarely deadly, causes fever, joint pain, rashes and conjunctivitis. The most serious consequence appears when the infected person is a pregnant woman, since during pregnancy this virus can originate a birth defect called microcephaly.
St. Louis Encephalitis, a mosquito-borne disease that is characterized by fever and headaches upon initial onset of infection, arises from mosquitoes who feed on birds who are infected with the illness, and can result in death. The most common vector of this disease is Culex pipiens, also known as the common house mosquito.
Heartworm disease, a parasitic roundworm infection that affects dogs and other canids. Mosquitoes transmit larvae to the definitive host through bites. Adult heart worms infest the right heart and pulmonary artery, where they can cause serious complications including congestive heart failure.

Potential transmission of HIV was originally a public health concern, but practical considerations and detailed studies of epidemiological patterns suggest that any transmission of the HIV virus by mosquitoes is at worst extremely unlikely.

Various species of mosquitoes are estimated to transmit various types of disease to more than 700 million people annually in Africa, South America, Central America, Mexico, Russia, and much of Asia, with millions of resultant deaths. At least two million people annually die of these diseases, and the morbidity rates are many times higher still.

Methods used to prevent the spread of disease, or to protect individuals in areas where disease is endemic, include:
 Vector control aimed at mosquito control or eradication
 Disease prevention, using prophylactic drugs and developing vaccines
 Prevention of mosquito bites, with insecticides, nets, and repellents

Since most such diseases are carried by "elderly" female mosquitoes, some scientists have suggested focusing on these to avoid the evolution of resistance.

Control 

Many measures have been tried for mosquito control, including the elimination of breeding places, exclusion via window screens and mosquito nets, biological control with parasites such as fungi and nematodes, or predators such as fish, copepods, dragonfly nymphs and adults, and some species of lizard and gecko. Another approach is to introduce large numbers of sterile males. Genetic modification methods including cytoplasmic incompatibility, chromosomal translocations, sex distortion and gene replacement, solutions seen as inexpensive and not subject to vector resistance, have been explored.

According to an article in Nature discussing the idea of totally eradicating mosquitoes, "Ultimately, there seem to be few things that mosquitoes do that other organisms can’t do just as well—except perhaps for one. They are lethally efficient at sucking blood from one individual and mainlining it into another, providing an ideal route for the spread of pathogenic microbes." The control of disease-carrying mosquitoes may in the future be possible using gene drives.

Repellents 

Insect repellents are applied on skin and give short-term protection against mosquito bites. The chemical DEET repels some mosquitoes and other insects. Some CDC-recommended repellents are picaridin, eucalyptus oil (PMD), and ethyl butylacetylaminopropionate (IR3535). Pyrethrum (from Chrysanthemum species, particularly C. cinerariifolium and C. coccineum) has been reviewed favorably in research published in 2021. Others are indalone, dimethyl phthalate, dimethyl carbate, and ethyl hexanediol.

Electronic insect repellent devices that produce ultrasounds intended to keep away insects (and mosquitoes) are marketed. No EPA or university study has shown that these devices prevent a human from being bitten by a mosquito.

Bites 

Mosquito bites lead to a variety of mild, occasionally serious, and, rarely, life-threatening allergic reactions. These include ordinary wheal and flare reactions and mosquito bite allergies (MBA). The MBA, also termed hypersensitivity to mosquito bites (HMB), are excessive reactions to mosquito bites that are not caused by any toxin or pathogen in the saliva injected by a mosquito at the time it takes its blood-meal. Rather, they are allergic hypersensitivity reactions caused by the non-toxic allergenic proteins contained in the mosquito's saliva. Studies have shown or suggest that numerous species of mosquitoes can trigger ordinary reactions as well as MBA. These include Aedes aegypti, Aedes vexans, Aedes albopictus, Anopheles sinensis, Culex pipiens, Aedes communis, Anopheles stephensi, Culex quinquefasciatus, Ochlerotatus triseriatus, and Culex tritaeniorhynchus. Furthermore, there is considerable cross-reactivity between the salivary proteins of mosquitoes in the same family and, to a lesser extent, different families. It is therefore assumed that these allergic responses may be caused by virtually any mosquito species (or other biting insect).

The mosquito bite allergies are informally classified as 1) the Skeeter syndrome, i.e. severe local skin reactions sometimes associated with low-grade fever; 2) systemic reactions that range from high-grade fever, lymphadenopathy, abdominal pain, and/or diarrhea to, very rarely, life-threatening symptoms of anaphylaxis; and 3) severe and often systemic reactions occurring in individuals that have an Epstein-Barr virus-associated lymphoproliferative disease, Epstein-Barr virus-negative lymphoid malignancy, or another predisposing condition such as Eosinophilic cellulitis or chronic lymphocytic leukemia.

Mechanism
Visible, irritating bites are due to an immune response from the binding of IgG and IgE antibodies to antigens in the mosquito's saliva. Some of the sensitizing antigens are common to all mosquito species, whereas others are specific to certain species. There are both immediate hypersensitivity reactions (types I and III) and delayed hypersensitivity reactions (type IV) to mosquito bites. Both reactions result in itching, redness and swelling. Immediate reactions develop within a few minutes of the bite and last for a few hours. Delayed reactions take around a day to develop, and last for up to a week.

Treatment
Several anti-itch medications are commercially available, including those taken orally, such as diphenhydramine, or topically applied antihistamines and, for more severe cases, corticosteroids, such as hydrocortisone and triamcinolone. Aqueous ammonia (3.6%) has also been shown to provide relief.

Both topical heat and cool may be useful to treat mosquito bites.

In human culture

Greek mythology
Ancient Greek beast fables including "The Elephant and the Mosquito" and "The Bull and the Mosquito", with the general moral that the large beast does not even notice the small one, derive ultimately from Mesopotamia.

Origin myths
The peoples of Siberia have origin myths surrounding the mosquito. One Ostiak myth tells of a man-eating giant, Punegusse, who is killed by a hero but will not stay dead. The hero eventually burns the giant, but the ashes of the fire become mosquitoes that continue to plague mankind.

Other myths from the Yakuts, Goldes (Nanai people), and Samoyed have the insect arising from the ashes or fragments of some giant creature or demon. Similar tales found in Native North American myth, with the mosquito arising from the ashes of a man-eater, suggest a common origin. The Tatars of the Altai had a similar myth, thought to be of Native North American origin, involving the fragments of the dead giant, Andalma-Muus, becoming mosquitoes and other insects.

Modern era

Winsor McCay's 1912 film How a Mosquito Operates was one of the earliest works of animation, which has been described as far ahead of its time in technical quality. It depicts a giant mosquito tormenting a sleeping man.

The de Havilland Mosquito was a high-speed aircraft manufactured between 1940 and 1950, and used in many roles.

References

Further reading 

 
 
 
 Jarvis, Brooke, "Buzz Off: They've ravaged humanity and derailed history. And mosquitoes aren't finished yet", The New Yorker, 5 & 12 August 2019, pp. 69–71. "[H]istorian Timothy C. Winegard... estimates that mosquitoes have killed more people than any other single cause – fifty-two billion of us, nearly half of all humans who have ever lived.... Globalization is helping to spread a new generation of mosquito-borne illnesses once confined to the tropics, such as dengue... chikungunya and Zika... Meanwhile, climate change is... expanding the ranges in which mosquitoes and the diseases they carry can thrive." (pp. 70–71.)

External links 

 
 Mosquito Information Website
 Mosquitoes chapter in United States Environmental Protection Agency National Public Health Pesticide Applicator Training Manual
 
 
 Parasitic Insects, Mites and Ticks: Genera of Medical and Veterinary Importance Wikibooks

.
Insect vectors of human pathogens
Articles containing video clips
Ectoparasites
Extant Jurassic first appearances
Hematophages
.
Insects in culture
Aquatic insects
Hazards of outdoor recreation